The 1931 Grand Prix season was a watershed year, with the advent of the AIACR European Championship.  After several years of Grand Prix racing in the doldrums with little technical development, 1931 saw new models come from all three main manufacturers: Bugatti, Maserati and Alfa Romeo.  

The AIACR regulations were to Formula Libre (open formula) rules for the cars, but the race-format chosen was to run the Grands Prix over a marathon ten hours each with two drivers per car. The pair had to be the same for all three races otherwise only the lead driver would score points. The championship was won by Ferdinando Minoia, driving for the Alfa Corse works team. He was tied on points with his team-mate Giuseppe Campari after the three races. Despite not having won any of the races, his consistency gave him the tiebreaker by covering a greater distance across the combined 30 hours of racing. However, the endurance format of the series was exhausting and unpopular with the drivers, and became processional and boring for the spectators and would not be repeated.

In the other major races of the season, the new Bugatti Type 51 won its first event, at Tunis, and dominated the French circuits in the early half of the season. The Italian Championship regularly drew the best drivers and gave close racing between Alfa Romeo, Bugatti and Maserati. At the end of the season, the championship was awarded to Alfa Romeo driver Campari, on a tie-breaker countback. With both major titles in their cabinet, Alfa Romeo finished the season strongly.

European Championship Grands Prix

Other Grand Épreuves

A grey background indicates the race was not held this year. Sources:

Major Races
Multiple classes are mentioned when they were divided and run to different race lengths.

Note: *Race mistakenly flagged by officials after only 99 laps, not the full 100 as scheduled

Regulations and Technical

In October 1930, the CSI regulatory body of the AIACR met to draft up rules for a new championship. The racing bodies of Belgium, France, Italy and Spain would hold events lasting ten hours, with the results merged as a single race- the International Grand Prix. Each body would contribute 150000 francs, and the driver covering the farthest distance over the four races would collect half a million francs. However, that idea was deemed impractical and instead the races should be discrete, individual events. As all the races took place in Europe it was renamed the European Automobile Championship.

The media soon spotted major issues with the proposal – after the abortive Manufacturer's Championship, just a few years earlier. If the field was whittled down after three or four hours, what was to be gained if only a half-dozen cars raced for the latter half of the race? They protested that it would bore the spectators, and drive them away well before the end of the races. However, the CSI was not swayed and confirmed the format in March. The Italian GP was moved from its traditional September to May to be able to run in good daylight and the Spanish GP was dropped from the list. Now the overall winner would receive 150000 francs. The two drivers had to be paired together for all three races and would only score points in the car they had been nominated for. In case of a tie, the driver(s) who had covered the greatest total distance would win the tie-break.
The cars would otherwise not be limited, running to Formula Libre. A proposal to run a gasoline/benzole mixture was discarded as Italy had no benzole.

Technical Innovation
After a lethargic period of years with only incremental development, 1931 saw a good range of new models and innovation from all three main manufacturers. At his son's insistence, Ettore Bugatti had swapped the Millers of American Leon Duray for a trio of Type 43 sports cars in 1929. Examination of the advanced engineering of the Miller engine led to the developed of the Bugatti Type 51. Essentially the same as the Type 35B, still using two valves per cylinder and a single carburettor, it was now fitted with twin overhead camshafts and put out 180 bhp. At the fast Monza Grand Prix, Bugatti also entered the new Type 54 (purportedly produced in only 13 days), with the 5-litre engine of the Type 50 sports car. But despite developing an enormous 300 bhp, raw power on paper was no key to success. Front-heavy, it handled poorly and was terrible on its tyres.

Maserati had led the way forward the previous year with the 8C-2500 engine in the Tipo 26M. The brothers further developed the engine, boring it out to 2.8-litres, also introduced at the Monza race. The team continued to run that model through this season, as well as the mighty, twin-engined V4 on the open fast circuits.
Voiturette racing was increasing in popularity again, with over a dozen races scheduled for the season. After his success the previous year, Alfieri felt encouraged to develop the 1.5-litre 26C. The new 1.1-litre twin-cam 4-cylinder model – either the 4CS sports car or 4CM (monoposto) single-seater - would soon dominate the small classes, and earn good money for Maserati in both prizemoney and privateer sales. 

With the final retirement of the Alfa Romeo P2 from front-line racing, Vittorio Jano produced two quite different models for the new Championship. 
The 8C 2300 was a development from the 6C 1750 sports car. Jano put a pair of 4-cylinder engines back-to-back with a common gear-train linking the two camshafts. Being centrally mounted it minimised the engine torque and vibration. It came in two variants – the long-wheelbase version was the sports car, while the nimbler, short-wheelbase model entered Grand Prix races.
To take on the big-engined Mercedes, Jano built the Tipo A. Taking two complete engines of the 6C 1750, and mounting them side by side. The mirror-image arrangement improved traction because of the equal and opposite torque of the engines. Alfa's (and Europe's) first monoposto, the driver sat centrally, over the two driveshafts in a deep, streamlined cockpit. Unlike the twin-engined Bugatti and Maserati, each engine of the Tipo A kept its own power-train with crankcase and driveshaft. A single gear lever controlled both gearboxes with an overrunning clutch. Only four were built.

Teams and drivers
The AIACR Championship regulations stipulated that each nominated driver-combination had to compete together in all three races to keep scoring points. Therefore, at the start of the season, at the Italian Grand Prix, the works teams declared these as their driver combinations: 

These tables only intend to cover entries in the major races, using the key above. It includes all starters in the Championship races.
Sources:

Significant Privateer drivers

Note: * raced in event as a relief driver, ♠ Works driver raced as a privateer. Those in brackets show, although entered, the driver did not race
Note: † driver killed during this racing season

Season review

Start of the season
The start of the year saw the first Winter Grand Prix. The Swedish Automobile Club had regularly run a road-race from Stockholm to Gothenburg. This year they mapped out a 50km course on the narrow roads through the woods near Lake Rämen. The pits and grandstands were built near the local railway station by the lake and oversaw a 2km stretch on the frozen lake. The 20 starters were mainly made up of local drivers with a diverse range of cars. These included a number of big-engined American stock cars, as well as a 1.5-litre Bugatti Type 37 and a 1.6-litre four-wheel drive Tracta. Two Finnish drivers, Karl Ebb and "Baron" Johan Ramsay travelled across but the big draw-card was German champion Rudi Caracciola driving his Mercedes SSK. Another SSK was entered by young Swede Per-Victor Widengren, returning from studies in the US and Germany.
On race-day, trains bought 30000 spectators to the track. Forty minutes after the start, Ebb’s Auburn came by leading the first lap from Widengren, Olsson and Caracciola. On the second lap, Ebb slid into a snowbank blocking the road. Olsson and Widengren had to stop and help push him clear to get past. Ebb waved Widengren through to take the lead. But both Mercedes retired at the halfway point with mechanical issues. When Olsson lost twenty minutes after sliding into a ditch, it gave Ebb a comfortable lead he held to the end. Ramsay made it a Finnish 1-2 coming home almost a quarter hour behind, both having used studded tyres, rather than chains, through the snow.

The Tunis Grand Prix was the culmination of a week of festivities celebrating the 50th anniversary of being a French protectorate, with the French president in attendance. With a dozen main class and seventeen voiturettes, it attracted a good field, led by the four-car Maserati works team. Luigi Fagioli and new team-driver René Dreyfus had the proven 26M, Clemente Biondetti the big V4, while Ernesto Maserati ran one of the original 1.5-litre Tipo 26 in the junior class. Achille Varzi arrived as a privateer with the brand new Bugatti Type 51.  Algerian Marcel Lehoux and German Heinrich-Joachim von Morgen ran the older Type 35B, while Philippe Étancelin and Polish émigré Count Stanisław Czaykowski had 2-litre Type 35C’s. This year, the race was held on a new triangular circuit outside the ancient city of Carthage. Strangely von Morgen's car was sabotaged on the ship from Europe when someone fed a piece of sacking into the fuel tank which then dissolved into the engine. Though Fagioli led the first lap, Varzi soon passed him and started building a lead, with Lehoux in third. When Fagioli had plug issues and Varzi a puncture, Lehoux was able to move into second. Despite having to stop for another puncture, Varzi gave the Type 51 a win on debut. An exciting duel for second lasted most of the race, with Fagioli's Maserati beating home Lehoux by just fifteen seconds. Maserati comfortably won the "voiturette" class finishing eighth overall, and over ten minutes ahead of Pierre Veyron’s Bugatti.

Monaco
The next major race was the lucrative Monaco Grand Prix. With 100000 francs prizemoney for the winner, it was already establishing itself as one of the glamour events on the calendar. The organisers had an invitation list that attracted a top-class field. The Maserati team and the top French drivers were back from Africa. The Bugatti works team arrived in force with Varzi joined by Louis Chiron, Albert Divo and Guy Bouriat running the new Type 51. The English Earl Howe was the first buyer of the new model (repainted in British racing green), leading a flotilla of privateer Bugattis, along with von Morgen's full German Bugatti Team. The Alfa Romeo works team gave Tazio Nuvolari the new 8C-2300. Luigi Arcangeli and Baconin Borzacchini had the 6C-1750GS, as did Goffredo Zehender driving for the Scuderia Ferrari. On such a tight track, the three big sports cars were quite incongruous: Caracciola now had the new lightweight Mercedes SSKL, fresh from a great win in the Mille Miglia the week before. Count Boris Ivanowski ran Caracciola's former SSK and French veteran André Boillot ran a 7-year old Peugeot 174.
Being a street circuit, the one-hour practice had to be held at 6am on Thursday and Friday mornings. Notable absentees were the Alfa Romeo team, whose Pirelli tyres had proven very poor in the Mille Miglia. Ivanowski only arrived on Saturday night after all practice had finished and was denied entry. René Dreyfus had drawn pole position and led the first few laps. “Williams” barged past but lost his engine on only the sixth lap. By the tenth lap, the top six were barely ten seconds apart with Varzi now just ahead of Dreyfus, Lehoux, Fagioli, Chiron and Caracciola. On lap 29, Varzi came into the pits on three wheels after smashing the other one on a curbstone. The repairs cost him four minutes and dropped him to sixth. With Dreyfus, Divo and Lehoux also experiencing issues, it was Chiron and Fagioli now setting the pace. After 50 laps, at the half-way point, only five of the remaining fifteen runners were still on the lead lap: Chiron forty seconds ahead of Fagioli, then Bouriat, Caracciola and Varzi. Howe was sixth, two laps back. Soon after, Caracciola crawled into the pits with his clutch broken. Bouriat took second place from Fagioli, who was having fuel-pressure problems, and having to navigate the twisty circuit one-handed while simultaneously pumping fuel with the other. Chiron was not slowing down, and put in the fastest lap of the race on lap 80, which Fagioli matched four laps later despite his fuel-flow issues. Bouriat had a late stop to change sparkplugs that dropped him to fifth. But no-one could catch Chiron, who took the flag a comfortable three minutes ahead of Fagioli and Varzi, winning his home Grand Prix. In a timekeeping blunder, the officials miscounted and dropped the flag a lap early. The crowds then poured onto the track and stopped the other finishers. Boillot and his Peugeot tourer came in sixth, behind Bouriat (Bugatti) and Zehender (Ferrari) after not having to stop during the race.

Just a week later, the first Italian race was held, at Alessandria. This year, the long 32 km circuit through the Piedmont countryside was replaced by a shorter 8 km track through the northern suburbs. The track proved a minefield though with a lot of loose stones scattered across the road being picked up by the cars. Fagioli again represented Maserati, with Dreyfus as reserve. But Varzi was the favourite with a new Type 51, painted red and driven straight from the Molsheim factory the day before. He was supported by a number of Bugattis including the German team. Alfa Romeo was represented by a strong Scuderia Ferrari team. Nuvolari had an 8C-2300 modified for grand prix use, while Arcangeli, Severi and Caniato drove the less powerful 6-cylinder models. A big field of 39 cars, including voiturettes took the start. Varzi short through from the second row to take the lead and was never headed, drawing away at five seconds a lap. Fagioli broke his gearbox on lap 3 and Nuvolari’s differential broke on lap 9. On route to victory, Varzi lapped all the field except for Giovanni Minozzi's Bugatti with von Morgen coming in third.

Targa Florio
Always the toughest race of the year, the Targa Florio was made far harder by terrible floods across Sicily in February. Landslides had demolished the mountain roads between Polizzi and Collessano and many parts of the Medio Madonie were ruined. Therefore, Comte Vincenzo Florio and the organisers decided to run the race on the “Grande Madonie” – the full 146 km circuit used in the first years of the event, from 1906 to 1911. This ran all the way around the Parco delle Madonie out to Castelbuono before rejoining the Medio circuit at Collessano. To do the four race laps, driver would take over 8000 corners.
Alfa Romeo put in the strongest team, with five cars: Nuvolari and Arcangeli ran the 8C-2300, while Campari, Borzacchini and Guido d'Ippolito had the 6C-1750GS. The competition would come from Varzi's Bugatti and the works Maseratis of Fagioli (still recovering after a recent hip operation), Dreyfus (the only foreigner racing this year) and Biondetti all running the 26M. Varzi led the small field of thirteen starters away and quickly set the pace. Near Castellana, Fagioli hit a bridge and badly bent his rear axle. After two laps it started raining. Jano had predicted that and fitted his Alfas with mudguards. Varzi, without them, was hindered and slowed by the mud and spray. Arcangeli also refused to have the mudguards fitted, and got injured in the eye by a flying stone, to be relieved by Zehender. Biondetti slid into a wall, getting slight injuries. Dreyfus, after changing fourteen spark-plugs and slipping off the road three times, was retired when the team realised he would not finish within the time limit. But Nuvolari and Borzacchini, also aided by the Alfa Romeo team using two-way radios around the track, pressed on hard through the heavy weather. Fog and torrential rain in the mountains made driving extremely hard, with the tyre ruts tearing up the roads. Varzi had a terrible final lap and he although finished first (car and driver completely covered in the yellow mud), Nuvolari had the shorter race-time to take the win. Borzacchini came in second, with Varzi ending up seven minutes back, just ahead of Campari.

The Moroccan Grand Prix had been held five times as a touring car race. This year, renamed as the Casablanca GP, it was held for racing cars on the new Anfa circuit in the western suburbs of Casablanca. Many of the top drivers from the French circuit came across for the race. Stanisław Czaykowski had just received his new Bugatti Type 51 and so was the favourite. Lehoux and Étancelin were still waiting for their new Bugatti and Alfa Romeo, respectively, to be delivered and ran their older Bugatti Type 35s instead. Montier, father and son had their Ford specials while Ferrand ran his old Peugeot. The voiturette class was dominated by 1.5-litre Bugatti Type 37s.
A sunny race-day drew a huge crowd with the dignitaries led by Sidi Mohammed, the Sultan of Morocco, along with the Grand Vizier and the French Resident-General Lucien Saint. Lehoux let for the first half of the race, but he had to stop to refuel whereas Czaykowski did not. The latter took the lead, and when Lehoux retired with an overstretched engine, he could cruise to victory with Étancelin second, a lap behind.

The European Championship

The new championship started at Monza with the Italian Grand Prix. Owing to the ten-hour format, the race had been rescheduled from its usual September date to May to avoid running into darkness. The Grand Prix had not been held since the tragic 1928 race when Emilio Materassi had crashed killing himself and 22 spectators.
The banked-oval half of the circuit had been closed and the circuit upgraded, so this was the return to the full 10 km circuit. The ten-hour race also demanded two drivers for each car. With an open formula on the cars, there was a wide variety in the sixteen cars that arrived, led by the two works teams. Maserati, realising their 26M was no longer competitive against the new models from Bugatti and Alfa Romeo did not attend, choosing to do further development instead. Bugatti arrived with two of their new cars. Now race-proven, their lead drivers of Varzi/Chiron were paired together in one while the other went the second team of Divo/Bouriat. Privateers Jean-Pierre Wimille and Marcel Lehoux had also now received their new Type 51s, to augment the works team with co-drivers Jean Gaupillat and Philippe Étancelin as their respective co-drivers. Bugatti's rival, Alfa Romeo, had three cars entered: two of the 8C-2300 models for Campari/Arcangeli and Marinoni/Zehender while the new Tipo A bimotore was assigned to Nuvolari/Borzacchini. The Scuderia Ferrari owners Caniato/Tadini entered their 6C-1750 model and Francesco Pirola ran a 6C-1500 "voiturette" with racing journalist Conte "Johnny" Lurani.
Two big Mercedes SSKs arrived, raced by Antonio Maino, and Boris Ivanowski. The Russian émigré had a hectic schedule for his car, with six major races in nine weeks which also included running it in the 24-hour races at Le Mans and Spa. The race was also the third round of the Italian driver's championship. Umberto Klinger and Luigi Castelbarco both had their Maseratis, while the Scuderia Materassi ran their 1920s-vintage Talbot 700s. The final arrival was Robert Sénéchal in his equally-dated 1.5-litre Delage.
Official practice was on Friday and Saturday. The Type A was found to be quite twitchy. While the teams were at Saturday lunch, Luigi Arcangeli took the car out for his first trial-runs. But after a sighting lap, he went off at speed at the Curva del Violone going onto the back straight, just as Ugo Sivocci had done in 1923 testing the new Alfa Romeo P1. Thrown from the car, he was killed instantly, with the car having apparently gone off the road at speed, side-swiping a tree and rolling several times. The Alfa Romeo team was ready to withdraw from the race until a telegram from Mussolini himself arrived that night, ordering them to race for Italian pride.

A sunny race-day did not see Maino's Mercedes or Castelbarco's Maserati on the grid. The Tipo A test-car had been prepared overnight by Alfa Romeo, who re-arranged their driver line-up: Marinoni was now paired up with Campari while reserve driver Minoia came in to drive with Zehender. At 8am, Air Force Marshal Italo Balbo waved the chequered flag to the 14 remaining starters. Campari shot into the lead but at the end of the first lap it was Varzi had passed him, ahead of Étancelin, Klinger and Ivanowski. With Divo and Sénéchal pitting early, the field soon split into distinct groups. Near the end of the first hour, after fifteen laps, Varzi had just lapped Nuvolari in fifth and held a one-minute lead over Campari with Lehoux and Minoia the only others on the lead lap. Surprisingly, only the Scuderia Ferrari Alfa had retired so far. In an effort to catch up, Campari set a new lap record on lap 24 but near the 2-hour mark, the Nuvolari/Borzacchini Alfa stopped on –track when one of its engines seized up. The Bugattis were having tyre problems though and when Varzi stopped, Campari took the lead. When he, in turn, pitted it was Nuvolari, not Marinoni, who took over the car. Similarly, Borzacchini subbed in for Zehender in the other Alfa. In the third hour, Chiron coasted into the pits to retire with a broken differential. This left Alfa Romeo running 1-2, a lap ahead of the privateer Bugatti of Lehoux and Maserati of Klinger, who moved up a spot when Lehoux's engine expired in the fourth hour.

By the halfway point, as predicted, the race has become a monotonous procession with only ten cars still running. The works Bugatti was having ongoing tyre-problems until changing over to the heavier-duty tyres used in the Targa Florio race. They were now third, three laps behind the leader. In the sixth hour, Varzi also drove the car for twenty laps. Campari passed 1000 km in just under 6½ hours. Klinger and Ghersi had an extended stop that dropped them from 4th to 8th. All the privateers were having various issues, all falling many laps behind. In the end, Sénéchal only drove five hours and would not be classified after changing three magnetos, not covering the 60% of the winner's distance. With a certain inevitability, the race continued to its conclusion. Campari and Nuvolari cruised home with a two-lap lead over their teammates with the works Bugatti coming third a lap further back. Wimille's Bugatti was seventeen laps behind the winner in fourth, while Klinger came out the pits at the end to be the last classified finisher in eighth. Because Ruggeri took over five minutes to complete his final lap, it was discounted and he was demoted to seventh behind Pirola’s Alfa on the same lap. With a 1-2 victory, breaking the Bugatti hold on Grand Prix wins, Alfa Romeo celebrated by giving their new car the “Monza” moniker.

After several false starts in the 1920s, a major race was finally held in Switzerland. Filed too late to the AIACR to be called the Swiss Grand Prix, it was instead run as the Geneva GP on a triangular town-to-town track to the west of the city, on the French border. As it was on the same weekend as the Rome GP, the Italian driver did not race. Nor did Chiron who, upon leaving his entry late, had travelled ahead leaving a mechanic to drive his Bugatti to the venue. When the tired mechanic crashed the car badly en route, he was left without a drive. The race was run as three heats, for the separate classes, leading to a 27-lap final. In the main-class heat, the Bugattis of Lehoux and Czaykowski were duelling closely. Lehoux had just lapped Klinger’s Maserati but when Czaykowski tried to pass the two collided. His car slewed off the road into a roadside house killing one and injuring two others. Czaykowski himself had a broken rib and bruised legs. Lehoux went on to win the final later in the day.
Three other races were held on this busiest racing weekend of the year. Mercedes won two of the races – Caracciola the Eifelrennen at the Nürburgring, while Hans Stuck won the Lwów Grand Prix in Poland. Most attention though was on the Rome Grand Prix, this year held on a banked high-speed circuit around the airfield in the north of the city. Being the next round of the Italian championship, it drew a big field and, as before, was run as a series of heats with a 60-lap final. Only the Maserati works team arrived – led by Ernesto Maserati in the 4-litre V4, with Fagioli and Dreyfus in the 26M and Biondetti in the 2-litre 26B. Their main competition would be Varzi's Bugatti and Nuvolari running both his own Type 35C and a loaned 2.3-litre Type 35B. A shrewd move as his own car failed in the second heat. In the final, Varzi led from Maserati, Dreyfus and Fagioli. Nuvolari was out early with broken suspension and on the fifteenth lap, Varzi burst a tyre and lost time in the pits. He had driven hard back into third when his ignition broke. Despite Fagioli being delayed, Maserati was able to lead home his team to a 1-2-3 finish with Biondetti coming through for third.

The ACF promoted the French Grand Prix as the 25th edition. Although the first Grand Prix had been in 1906, there had only 17 races. However, the ACF included the inter-city races from 1895 to 1903 to add to their prestige. For the first Grand Prix's 25th anniversary, a special luncheon was held with the first two winners, Ferenc Szisz and Felice Nazzaro, as guests of honour. But it did provide one of the strongest entry lists for many years with all three works teams entered. The AIACR rules said the same driver combinations had to carry over for each race. Bugatti maintained their team. Alfa Romeo, after the enforced changes following Arcangeli's death, changed around their driver pairings again. Borzacchini now co-drove with Campari, with Nuvolari had Giovanni Minozzi and Minoia with Zehender, although this removed their co-drivers from the championship reckoning. Maserati had their new 2.8-litre Tipo 26M for Fagioli/Maserati. The other pairs, Dreyfus/Ghersi and Biondetti/Parenti had the older 2.5-litre.
A strong privateer field was entered: Wimille and Lehoux in their Bugattis, Caracciola and Ivanowski had their 7-litre Mercedes – the first time German cars had raced at the Grand Prix since 1914. The race also attracted a significant British contingent; Earl Howe, having just won the Le Mans 24-hour the week before in his Alfa Romeo 8C-2300 tourer, now had a new Bugatti Type 51, while his victorious co-driver Tim Birkin ran a Maserati 26M. “Williams” ran his 2-litre Bugatti, William Scott had a 5-year old Delage and Jack Dunfee had a 1925 Sunbeam. All in all there were 23 starters. In practice Bugatti again found, as at Le Mans a week earlier, that their Michelin tyres were failing. They were going to withdraw but Williams still had a set of Dunlop tyres to test with. A full set of tyres was flown out overnight from England for the team and in gratitude gave “Williams” a third works car for the race, rejoining the team.

On the startline, Dunfee’s Sunbeam broke its universal joint. Fagioli's Maserati led the first lap from team-mate Dreyfus with the Bugattis of Chiron, “Williams”, Lehoux and Divo following. Chiron took the lead on the fourth lap and he and Fagioli continued swapping the lead for the next two hours. Around three hours the first refueling and driver-changes started. Varzi was able to build a half-lap lead over Maserati, with Ghersi close behind in formation. Minozzi's Alfa, and the Bugattis of Bouriat and Conelli were the only other cars remaining on the lead lap. In the fourth hour, Maserati started slipping back with brake issues while the problematic supercharger on Caracciola's Mercedes finally stopped the car out on the track. After five hours, the spectators were getting bored and wandered off for lunch. Despite seventeen cars still running, the long 12 km circuit spread them out to a monotonous procession. Chiron now had nearly a full lap's lead over Divo, with Dreyfus, “Williams” and the Alfas of Nuvolari and Minoia following. Campari was well down, five laps back, after persistent brake problems. The Bugattis benefitted from having a one-piece wheel and brake-drum unit which meant brakes could be changed at each pit stop in the same time as changing wheels, thereby avoiding such issues. This superior pitwork got the three works Bugattis into the top-three by the sixth hour. But in the 7th hour, the “Williams” car broke its universal joint and retired. The Dreyfus Maserati had severe brake problems, spending a long time in the pits and in the end had to pillage a spare from the now-retired Fagioli car. A similar ailment afflicted the Nuvolari Alfa soon after. 
The order settled down for the next few hours: Chiron and Varzi had a lap on Divo/Bouriat while the delays to others put Campari/Borzacchini into third albeit four laps further back. Next were the Maseratis of Birkin and Biondetti. In the final hour, Divo came to a stop on the track – the bolts on the engine had worked loose and he had no tools on board. Told to slow down by his pit, Varzi dropped his lap times by a minute to protect the car. Despite Campari putting in fast laps at the end, Varzi/Chiron still had a comfortable victory, completing exactly 100 laps, three laps ahead of the Alfa Romeo, with the Biondetti/Parenti Maserati third. Birkin/Eyston were the first privateers home in fourth, while the cars of Divo and Nuvolari, though not running at the end, had covered sufficient distance to be classified for points.

July
Two weeks later, the French drivers met again at the very fast Reims circuit for the Marne GP. The entry-list was dominated by Bugattis and the favourites included Chiron, Lehoux and a fit-again Czaykowski in their Type 51s. Lehoux's erstwhile co-driver, Philippe Étancelin, was now driving the first Alfa Romeo 8C ‘Monza’ in private hands and René Dreyfus entered for the Maserati works team. Chiron only lasted two laps, put out by gearbox failure, and it was Lehoux taking the lead and extending it over Dreyfus and Czaykowski and Étancelin. Which is how it stayed for the next two hours, with Lehoux setting the fastest lap at an average of nearly 150 km/h and winning by two minutes.

Just a week later was the third, and final, race in the new Championship: the Belgian Grand Prix run a week after the 24-hour sports-car race at the same circuit. The calculation was simple: Campari, with a first and a second, only needed to finish to be crowned the inaugural European Champion. Once again Maserati chose not to attend, nominally to better prepare for the upcoming (non-Championship) German Grand Prix. Only a dozen cars were entered with a two-way struggle between Bugatti an Alfa Romeo expected: after their failure at Monza, Bugatti had changed to Dunlop tyres, while Alfa Romeo had adjusted their rear-axle ratio to address the lack of speed shown at Montlhéry. Bugatti kept the same three pairings they used at Montlhéry, while Alfa Corse changed theirs again. This time put Zehender with Campari while Nuvolari and Borzacchini combined once more. Minozzi co-drove for Minoia, who was given the Targa Florio-styled version, with external fuel-tank and bucket seats. Tim Birkin entered his Alfa Romeo, converted to racing format from the touring style he had run at the 24-hour endurance the week before. Racing with Eyston at that event, he now teamed up with Brian Lewis, Baron Essendon, who himself has previously co-drove with Earl Howe at Montlhéry. French privateer Jean Pesato had his smaller 1.75-litre Alfa and Jean-Pierre Wimille was in his Type 51. The final entrants were Ivanowski's Mercedes and the Montier father and son with their Ford Specials.

Grand Prix cars had last raced at Spa in 1925 and Varzi beat the lap record on the first lap from a standing start. Immediately the rivalry between Varzi and Nuvolari started with the lead changing back and forth. After one hour (nine laps) the two were still nose-to-tail, with “Williams” further back in third, followed by Minoia, Wimille, Divo, Birkin and Campari driving a conservative race and Ivanowski. Already Pesato and the Montiers were falling well behind. As expected, the cars made their first pit-stops in the third hour with only Chiron, Borzacchini and Conelli now on the lead lap. During his stint, Chiron put in faster and faster laps to start building a lead over the Alfa. Just after the sixth hour, when the second changes were expected, great drama occurred. Coming down to La Source hairpin, Campari's car suddenly burst into flames. Despite the driver's attempts to put it out the fire destroyed the car – the early DNF would cost Campari 6 championship points. Around a similar time, Chiron pulled off the track to repair the engine magneto. Although able to get going again, he would not get much further as the camshaft was broken.

This now left Nuvolari/Borzacchini with a 9 km (4-minute) lead over “Williams”/Conelli, with Minoia and Divo both two laps back. Then, when Divo/Bouriat retired in the 7th hour with a broken differential, this moved Birkin’s Alfa Romeo up to fourth, running four laps behind. Going into the last hour, Conelli pitted for a very fast refuel and brake-change. “Williams” went out and put in very fast laps, gaining on the Alfa Romeo at a rate of around ten seconds a lap. When Borzacchini came into the pits with a misfire complaining of fuel-feed problems, the Bugatti took the lead. After several stops, Nuvolari did some repairs then jumped in and took off with a misfire, now a lap behind. Although he caught and passed the Bugatti, time had run out. “Williams” took the flag by three-quarters of a lap, the Bugatti having spent only five minutes in the pits. Minoia/Minozzi were three laps behind, with Birkin’s Alfa fourth and Ivanowski's Mercedes in fifth a dozen laps behind the winner. Minoia's third place put him on equal points as Campari after the latter's early retirement, and having finished all three races, he won the tie-break by having covered just over 560 km further. Now a 47-year old veteran, Minoia had started racing in the 1907 Targa Florio and won the inaugural Mille Miglia. He became the first European Driver's Champion.

The fifth German Grand Prix was held at the Nürburgring, using only the longer Nordschleife track for the first time. A big field of 31 starters took part in two classes: the cyclecars and voiturettes up to 1100cc would run 18 laps while the main class did 22 laps. Although there was no works team, Mercedes-Benz was well represented in their home Grand Prix with six cars, led by Rudolf Caracciola along with Hans Stuck and up-and-coming Manfred von Brauchitsch. The Bugatti team arrived in force with four cars, for Varzi, Chiron, Divo and Bouriat. There was also the German Bugatti Team with two cars – a Type 51 for von Morgen and an older 35B for Burggaller. Lehoux, Wimille and Earl Howe also arrived with their Type 51s. Maserati, having missed the Belgian GP, had four cars entered although only two arrived – for Fagioli and Dreyfus. Alfa Romeo were to be represented by the Scuderia Ferrari, but Borzacchini did not arrive so Nuvolari was their sole starter. The other notable entry was that of American driver Phil “Red” Shafer who bought his own Shafer Special, a 2-seat racecar with a 4.3-litre Buick engine.

A huge crowd of over 100,000 arrived in drizzle for the 10am start. “Williams” had taken over Divo’s Bugatti and his own car was scratched. The big Mercedes were at the front of the grid while the Bugatti works team were all stuck in the middle with Nuvolari and Wimille at the back. Caracciola led Fagioli, von Morgen and Varzi at the end of the first lap, but by the end of the second lap Nuvolari had got up to fourth. After an hour, and five laps, Caracciola had a 1-minute lead over Nuvolari and Fagioli. On the 12th lap most of the cars (aside Nuvolari and von Morgen) pitted for refuelling as the rain gradually eased. Chiron had sped up as the track dried and passed Nuvolari but was still two minutes behind Caracciola. The rough, undulating track was damaging suspensions and cause oil leaks and a number of drivers (including “Williams”, Fagioli, Shafer and Dreyfus) retired with damaged engines or gearboxes for lack of oil in them. Although Chiron was steadily catching Caracciola, the German was able to manage his tyres well and held on to win by just over a minute. Varzi put in the fastest lap of the race to overtake von Morgen for third, who was losing oil pressure and retired on the last lap. This was the first motor-race to be broadcast over radio, with four commentators stationed at key corners reporting in via telephone.

Italy in August
While the German drivers were at the Avusrennen, most of the rest of Europe's top drivers were at the Coppa Ciano at the end of a week-long festival of racing on the coast at Livorno. It was another close race between Bugatti, Alfa Romeo and Maserati, and with a combined field with the voiturettes there were over 40 starters, started in threes at 1-minute intervals. Nuvolari, racing for the Scuderia Ferrari, took the lead initially and after his nearest rivals Fagioli and Varzi had early issues, was able to build a strong lead. Late in the race, Chiron pressed hard and Nuvolari had a small excursion on the hilly roads that made him drop his pace. But despite Chiron completing the race first, it was Nuvolari's victory on elapsed time.

A fortnight later, the circus re-convened for the Coppa Acerbo on the long, fast Pescara circuit. Many of the French drivers were at the Saint-Gaudens race in southern France, but a quality field was entered for the penultimate round of the Italian Championship. The long straights favoured the big bimotore with Nuvolari and Campari driving the Alfa Romeo Tipo A (under Scuderia Ferrari) and Maserati in his V4. Varzi and Chiron were again nominally independents but had Bugatti factory support. Campari led the start from Fagioli, Nuvolari and Varzi. But once again, as at AVUS the hot temperatures and very high speeds played havoc with the tyres. Maserati, Fagioli and Varzi were delayed with delamination issues. Nuvolari pursued Campari and took the lead only for the pace to blow a gasket on one of his engines and overheat it. Campari drove more cautiously and took the victory from Chiron with Nuvolari's crippled Alfa third. The championship culminated at the Monza Grand Prix. The race format was a 14-lap heat for each of the three classes with the top finishers of those racing off in a 35-lap final. The works teams arrived with full sets of their new cars for the fast track: Alfa Romeo had the biggest presence with top drivers Nuvolari and Campari in the Tipo A in the over 3-litre class, while Minoia, Borzacchini and Minozzi had the “Monza” Grand Prix car in the middle-class. Bugatti had Varzi and Chiron in the 5-litre Type 54. While Ernesto Maserati raced the big V4, teammates Fagioli and Dreyfus now both had the 2.8-litre 8C with Ruggeri in the older 26M, looking for a win in the 2-litre class. He was up against a field of Bugatti Type 35s and Alfa Romeo 6Cs. Marcel Lehoux was the only driver in a Bugatti Type 51 and “Phi-Phi” Étancelin had his Alfa Romeo ‘Monza’.
Ruggeri won the first heat, in the 2-litre class, for Maserati beating the Bugattis of Castelbarco and Czaykowski. Maserati was triumphant again in the second heat (for 3-litre cars) with Fagioli and Dreyfus leading home Minoia and Lehoux. Perhaps surprisingly, it was Nuvolari's Alfa Romeo, and not the Bugattis, that had tyre problems in the third heat, with Varzi and Chiron leading home the Italians. Finally, there was an open repêchage race for those cars finishing 5th – 8th in each heat. In the end only four cars chose to enter, but tragedy struck near the end of the race when Étancelin went off the track at the Lesmo corner into spectators standing in an illegal area. Two were killed and fourteen wounded; Étancelin himself of only slightly injured. Borzacchini, Minozzi and Ghersi qualified.
The four qualifiers from the 2-litre heat, knowing they would be outclassed, all chose not to contest the final. In the slipstreaming battle, the lead changed several times in the early part of the race. Nuvolari retired with blown piston and by the tenth lap, Fagioli, Varzi, Dreyfus and Chiron had established a gap. Nuvolari called Minoia, the newly crowned European Champion, in to take over his car. The Bugattis had a bad race: Varzi had to pit twice for a successive tyre failures, and tyre debris severed one of Chiron's brake cables. Although Dreyfus also suffered engine issues, Fagioli continued on untroubled to take the win, a minute ahead of Borzacchini. Varzi recovered to take third while the Nuvolari/Minoia car was fourth. The victory put Varzi, Nuvolari, Campari and Fagioli all on equal points in the championship. The RACI decreed that Nuvolari and Campari had precedence as they had won the major races – Nuvolari won the Targa Florio and together they had won the Italian GP. In the end, they awarded the championship to Campari.

The end of the season
The last major event of the year was the second Masaryk Circuit, held on the long road circuit west of the city of Brno. With the other national events completed, it was able to attract most of the top European drivers and teams. Maserati and Fagioli ran their 8C cars; Alfa Romeo drivers Nuvolari, Borzacchini and Siena raced for the Scuderia Ferrari while Varzi, Chiron and Lehoux had their own Bugattis. Caracciola and Stuck also ran as privateers, although had notable factory support from Mercedes-Benz. A big crowd arrived on a cold Sunday morning for the race, started by former driver Eliška Junková. As a memorial to her husband, killed in 1928 at the German GP, the would be a special prize to the fastest driver on the seventh lap. From the start, Fagioli burst into the lead, but on the second lap he hit a wooden pedestrian bridge support collapsing it and blocking the road. Somehow Borzacchini, Lehoux and Chiron were able to squeeze past but Nuvolari, Varzi and Caracciola could not avoid the wreckage, damaging their own cars. Varzi pitted to change three wheels, and also dropped off Nuvolari who had hitched a ride back with him.

Racing was strong again in Europe, with most of the major races easily attracting well over 100,000 spectators, despite the hard economic climate. There was a diversity of cars and the different manufacturers were well-matched and provided exciting racing with variety of personalities for the crowds to rally behind, as their favourites. It was apparent the power base for motor-racing was in Italy.
Throughout the season, many of the major races also ran a voiturette race before or alongside them. Usually for cars up to 1.1 or 1.5-litre engines, they were well-supported with good sized fields. The most consistent performer was Frenchman José Scaron, in his 1.1-litre supercharged Amilcar. He won the Italian Voiturette Grand Prix (held with the Monza GP) and at Casablanca, and placed at the German and Tunis Grands Prix and was often racing against driver in their 1.5-litre supercharged Bugatti Type 37As.
Overall it had been a very positive year for Mercedes. With the depressed German economy, there was no sponsorship money available from fuel or automotive companies and managing director Wilhelm Kissel had closed the works racing team at the end of 1930 following the wishes of his board. However, development on the SSK produced the new lightweight model, and Kissel was able to provide works assistance to his best driver, Rudolf Caracciola, nominally running as a privateer. With the SSKL, he became the first foreigner to win the Mille Miglia after the two favourites, Nuvolari and Varzi, both had early issues. Caracciola also won the three major German races in the year – the Avusrennen, Eifelrennen and national Grand Prix and retained the European Mountain Championship. According to Alfred Neubauer, his prizemoney came to RM180,000, when a Mercedes machinist earned RM2500 annually. And to cap it all, Mercedes won the Spa 24-hours and was second in the Le Mans 24 hour sports-car races. This boded well for the German manufacturer’s future.

Championship final standings

Note: *Not racing with his designated co-driver, therefore AIACR rules excluded him from the Championship standings

Bold font indicates starting on pole position, while italics show the driver of the race's fastest lap.

Source:  Information for 1st to 7th drivers originates from 1931 AUTOMOBIL-REVUE, while data for drivers 8 to 30 was compiled in 2008.

Results of the other major races

italics show the driver of the race's fastest lap.
Only those drivers with a best finish of 6th or better, or a fastest lap, are shown. Sources:

Footnotes

Citations

References
 Acerbi, Leonardo (2015) Mille Miglia – A race in pictures    Milan: Giorgio Nada Editorie  
 Cimarosti, Adriano (1997) The Complete History of Grand Prix Motor Racing    London: Aurum Press Ltd  
 Fondi, Pino (2006) Targa Florio: 20th Century Epic    Milan: Giorgio Nada Editore  
 Georgano, Nick (1971) The Encyclopaedia of Motor Sport    London: Ebury Press Ltd  
 Higham, Peter (1995) The Guinness Guide to International Motor Racing    London: Guinness Publishing  
 Legate, Trevor (2006) 100 years of Grand Prix    Kent: Touchstone Books Ltd  
 Ludvigsen, Karl (2008) Racing Colours - Italian Racing Red    Surrey: Ian Allan Publishing Ltd  
 Ludvigsen, Karl (2009) Racing Colours - German Racing Silver    Surrey: Ian Allan Publishing Ltd  
 Monkhouse, George (1953) Grand Prix Racing Facts and Figures   London: G.T. Foulis & Co Ltd
 Rendall, Ivan (1993) The Chequered Flag – 100 years of Motor Racing    London: Weidenfeld & Nicolson Ltd  
 Reuss, Eberhard (2008) Hitler's Motor Racing Battles    Yeovil: Haynes Publishing  
 Spurring, Quentin (2017) Le Mans 1930-39    Sherbourne, Dorset: Evro Publishing  
 Venables, David (2009) Racing Colours - French Racing Blue    Surrey: Ian Allan Publishing Ltd

External links

  1931 Race Season – comprehensive race reports of most events, also listing entries and results. Retrieved 26 Nov 2020
  1931 World Championship – detailed article about the championship regulations. Retrieved 26 Nov 2020
  Grand Prix Winners 1895–1949 : History – Hans Etzrodt's description of the annual regulations, and changes. Retrieved 26 Nov 2020
 TeamDan  - Darren Galpin’s list of the major races, entrants and results of the season. Retrieved 26 Nov 2020
 SpeedFreaks  - list of the major races, entrants and results of the season. Retrieved 26 Nov 2020
  6th Gear  - list of the major races and winners each year. Retrieved 26 Nov 2020
  MotorSport magazine – list of the year's races, entrants and results, by category. Retrieved 26 Nov 2020
  Grand Prix History – history of the Targa Florio race. Retrieved 26 Nov 2020
  La Targa Florio – race report and pictures of the Targa Florio. Retrieved 26 Nov 2020
  F2 Register – race results of the Targa Florio. Retrieved 26 Nov 2020
  Motorsport Memorial – motor-racing deaths by year. Retrieved 26 Nov 2020
  ChampCar Stats – list of all the races, entrants and results of the AAA Championship. Retrieved 26 Nov 2020

Grand Prix seasons
1931 in motorsport
 
1931 in American motorsport